Marmoutier Abbey — also known as the Abbey of Marmoutier or Marmoutiers — was an early monastery outside Tours, Indre-et-Loire, France. In its later days it followed the Benedictine order as an influential monastery with many dependencies.

History
The abbey was founded by Saint Martin of Tours (316-397), in 372, after he had been made Bishop of Tours in 371. Martin's biographer, Sulpicius Severus (c. 363–c. 425), affirms that Martin withdrew from the press of attention in the city to live in Marmoutier (Majus Monasterium), the monastery he founded several miles from Tours on the opposite shore of the river Loire.

Sulpicius described the severe restrictions of the life of Martin among the cave-dwelling cenobites who gathered around him, a rare view of a monastic community that preceded the Benedictine rule:

According to the French chronicler St. Denis, the Muslims in 732 had made the decision to attack and destroy the monastery. 
In 853 the abbey was pillaged and destroyed by Normans, who killed over 100 monks. In 982 the abbey, which had fallen into some disorders, was restored by Majolus of Cluny, Abbot of Cluny, at the instance of Eudes I, Count of Blois and of Tours, who died a monk at Marmoutier. During the years shortly after 1000 AD, the abbey grew considerably, becoming one of the richest in Europe.

In the wake of the Norman Conquest the abbey acquired patronage of churches in England. In 1096 Pope Urban II consecrated its new chapel, and preached the First Crusade. Pope Calixtus II preached crusade again in 1119, convincing Count Foulques V d'Anjou to take part and leading to his subsequent role as King of Jerusalem. In 1162 Pope Alexander III, who came to reside in Tours after being chased from Rome by Frederick Barbarossa, consecrated the monastery's new Chapel Saint Benoit.

The abbey eventually grew too small for its inhabitants, and was completely rebuilt at the start of the thirteenth century under the leadership of Abbot Hugues des Roches. Work was periodically interrupted by violent attacks made by the counts of Blois on the monks of Marmoutier. In 1253 Louis IX took the abbey under his protection. In the following century its abbot Gérard du Puy became cardinal-nephew to the last of the Avignon popes, Gregory XI. In 1562 the abbey was again pillaged, this time by Huguenot Protestants at the start of the Wars of Religion. Again however it recovered. English diarist John Evelyn visited the abbey, and recorded this entry for June 6, 1644:

The abbey was disestablished in 1799 during the French Revolution, and within a few decades the bulk of its buildings had been demolished. 

American writer Henry James visited the abbey in 1883, being guided through the various buildings by "a chatty nun", as described in his book A Little Tour in France. 

The former abbey grounds are now the location of a Catholic private school, the Institution Marmoutier.

References

Sources
 Sulpitius Severus On the Life of St. Martin. Translation and Notes by Alexander Roberts. In A Select Library of Nicene and Post-Nicene Fathers of the Christian Church, New York, 1894, available online
 John Evelyn, Diary and Correspondence: Volume 1, ed. William Bray, London: George Bell and Sons, 1882. Chapter 5. 

 France Balade online article

370s establishments
4th-century establishments in Roman Gaul
Benedictine monasteries in France
Buildings and structures in Indre-et-Loire
Christian monasteries established in the 4th century
Monasteries destroyed during the French Revolution
1799 disestablishments in France